Orsanmichele ("Kitchen Garden of St. Michael", from the Tuscan contraction of the Italian word orto) is a church in the Italian city of Florence. The building was constructed on the site of the kitchen garden of the monastery of San Michele which no longer exists.

Located on the Via Calzaiuoli in Florence, the church was originally built as a grain market in 1337 by Francesco Talenti, Neri di Fioravante, and Benci di Cione. Between 1380 and 1404, it was converted into a church used as the chapel of Florence's powerful craft and trade guilds. On the ground floor of the square building are the 13th-century arches that originally formed the loggia of the grain market. The second floor was devoted to offices, while the third housed one of the city's municipal grain storehouses, maintained to withstand famine or siege. Late in the 14th century, the guilds were charged by the city to commission statues of their patron saints to embellish the facades of the church. The sculptures seen today are copies, the originals having been removed to museums (see below).

Interior 

Inside the church is Andrea Orcagna's bejeweled Gothic Tabernacle (1355–59) encasing a repainting by Bernardo Daddi's of an older icon of the "Madonna and Child".

Exterior 

The facades held 14 architecturally designed external niches, which were filled from 1399 to around 1430. The three richest guilds opted to make their figures in the far more costly bronze, which cost approximately ten times the amount of the stone figures.

Modern assessment

Orsanmichele's statuary is a relic of the fierce devotion and pride of Florentine trades, and a reminder that great art often arises out of a competitive climate. Each trade hoped to outdo the other in commissioning original, groundbreaking sculptures for public display on Florence's most important street, and the artists hired and materials used (especially bronze) indicate the importance that was placed on this site.

Today, all of the original sculptures have been removed and replaced with modern duplicates to protect them from the elements and vandalism. The originals mainly reside in the museum of Orsanmichele, which occupies the upper floor of the church, and can be seen on every Monday, the only day when the museum is open. Two works by Donatello are in other Florentine museums: St. George and its niche are in the Bargello, and St. Louis of Toulouse is in the museum of the Basilica di Santa Croce.

References

Bibliography 

Campbell. 2011. Italian Renaissance art. Farnborough: Thames & Hudson Ltd.

External links 

 
 
 

The Orsanmichele Museum
National Gallery of Art, exhibition Orsanmichele
khan academy video

 
Buildings and structures completed in 1337
14th-century Roman Catholic church buildings in Italy
Roman Catholic churches in Florence
Gothic architecture in Florence
 
Sculpture galleries in Italy